Nimit Oza (b. 3 October 1981) is an Indian writer, columnist, and doctor from Gujarat, India. An urologist by profession, he is known for his novel Chromosome XY (2019) and Pappa ni Girlfriend (2020). He won the 2020 Darshak Award for Chromosome XY.

Biography
Nimit Oza was born on 3 October 1981 in Porbandar to Nikhil Oza and Harshana Oza. He completed his schooling from Dakshinamurti Vinay Mandir, Bhavnagar in 1999. He completed MBBS from Government Medical College, Bhavnagar, and received DNB in Urology from Pune.

Works
Oza published his first novel, Chromosome XY, in 2019. It is a medical science fiction, and is based on the subject of male pregnancy. His other novels include Pappa ni Girlfriend (2020) and Aham Brahmasmi (2021). His literary essays are collected in Maati no Manas (2017). His Ajvala no Autograph (2020) and Shwas ni Serendipity (2020) are the collections of articles on various subjects. He writes weekly columns Ajvala no Autograph and Man no Monologue in Gujarati daily Divya Bhaskar.

Published works
 Maati no Manas (2017)
 Mari Vahali Pariksha (2017)
 Expiry Date (2017)
 I.C.U (2018)
 Chromosome XY (2019)
 Jindagi Tane Thank You (2019)
 Pappa ni Girlfriend (2020)
 Ajvala no Autograph (2020)
 Shwas ni Serendipity (2020)
 Ene Mrutyu Na Kaho (2021)
 Amor Mio (2021)
 Aham Brahmasmi (2021)

Awards
Oza won the 2020 Darshak Award for Chromosome XY, for which, he also received the Gujarat Sahitya Akademi's Best Book Prize (2020). He received the GLF Award (2017–18) for his book Mari Vahali Pariksha (2017).

See also
 List of Gujarati-language writers

Reference 

1994 births
Living people
Novelists from Gujarat
People from Porbandar
Indian columnists